Sumichrast's harvest mouse (Reithrodontomys sumichrasti) is a species of rodent in the family Cricetidae.
It is found in Costa Rica, El Salvador, Guatemala, Honduras, Mexico, Nicaragua, and Panama.

References

 Baillie, J. 1996.  Reithrodontomys sumichrasti.   2006 IUCN Red List of Threatened Species.   Downloaded on 20 July 2007.
Musser, G. G. and M. D. Carleton. 2005. Superfamily Muroidea. pp. 894–1531 in Mammal Species of the World a Taxonomic and Geographic Reference. D. E. Wilson and D. M. Reeder eds. Johns Hopkins University Press, Baltimore.

Reithrodontomys
Rodents of Central America
Mammals described in 1861
Taxonomy articles created by Polbot